Kamran Atif is a member of Harkat-ul Mujahideen al-Alami. In 2002, he tried to assassinate President Pervez Musharraf.  Following a shootout with police, Atif was arrested in Karachi in 2004. He was sentenced to death in 2006 by the Anti-Terrorism Court in Pakistan.

References

Terrorism in Pakistan